Cheshire Village is a census-designated place (CDP) comprising the primary village and adjacent residential land in the town of Cheshire, New Haven County, Connecticut, United States. It is in the center of the town, surrounding the intersections of Connecticut Routes 10, 70, and 68. 

As of the 2010 census, the CDP had a population of 5,786, out of 29,261 in the entire town of Cheshire.

References 

Census-designated places in New Haven County, Connecticut
Census-designated places in Connecticut